The 15059 / 60 Lalkuan Junction - Anand Vihar Terminal Intercity Express is an Intercity Express train belonging to Indian Railways North Eastern Railway zone that runs between  and  in India.

Coaches
The 15059 / 60 Lalkuan Junction - Anand Vihar Terminal Intercity Express has one AC Chair Car, six Non AC chair car, five general unreserved & two SLR (seating with luggage rake) coaches . It does not carry a pantry car coach.

As is customary with most train services in India, coach composition may be amended at the discretion of Indian Railways depending on demand.

Service

Routing

Traction
As the route is going to be electrified, a   based WDM-3A diesel locomotive pulls the train to its destination.

References

External links
15059 Intercity Express at India Rail Info
15060 Intercity Express at India Rail Info

Intercity Express (Indian Railways) trains
Rail transport in Uttarakhand
Transport in Haldwani-Kathgodam
Rail transport in Delhi
Transport in Delhi